Heesselt is a village in the Dutch province of Gelderland. It is a part of the municipality of West Betuwe, and lies about 10 km southwest of Tiel.

It was first mentioned in 850 as Hesola, and probably means "forest with shrubbery". In 1840, it was home 258 people. The Dutch Reformed Church dates from 1887, but has a 15th century tower.

Gallery

References

Populated places in Gelderland
West Betuwe